Multnomah County Sheriff's Office (MCSO) serves the close to 700,000 residents of Multnomah County, Oregon, United States.  Multnomah County Sheriff's Office is a County Law Enforcement agency that handles 9-1-1 calls and assists other city agencies such as Portland Police Bureau. The current Sheriff is Michael Reese. The cities of Maywood Park, Wood Village, Fairview, and Troutdale contract out the law enforcement services of Multnomah County Sheriff's Office.

The sheriff is elected by popular vote, and oversees a budget of $118 million.

History 
Multnomah County Sheriff's Office was established in February 1854, with William L. McMillen as the first sheriff; he served until 1862. In 1960, the Sheriff's Office created the River Patrol Unit, which has grown to be the largest river patrol division in the state.

In the past, as recently as the 1980s, the position was essentially the "top cop" in the county, performing law enforcement for the bulk of the county's population. , however, as the unincorporated areas of the county have diminished, 85% of sheriff's office employees work in corrections rather than law enforcement.

On July 1, 2015, the Sheriff's Office began policing services for the city of Troutdale.  In a 10-year agreement, the officers and civilian personnel of the Troutdale Police department were brought in as sworn deputies and employees of the Sheriff's Office.  The agreement was reported to save the City of Troutdale over $900,000 per year over a ten-year period. The deal also included leasing of the Troutdale Police Community Center.  The Law Enforcement patrol, property, and records divisions were also moved from the Hansen Building to this location in July, 2015.

The sheriff's office oversees a budget of $118 million.

Controversy 
Former Sheriff Bernie Giusto resigned on July 1, 2008 after a state police standards board recommended that he lose his badge because of multiple issues including using an official vehicle for personal use, lying about a relationship he had with former Governor Neil Goldschmidt's wife while he was assigned to the governor's protective service branch in the mid-1980s, and allegations that he lied about his knowledge of Goldschmidt's illegal sexual relationship with a minor in the 1970s. In addition to ethics violations, Giusto was thought to have managed the county budget poorly, and when confronted about such issues once replied with "They're not my bosses; they're my bankers, I'm not gonna debate how I do spend my budget. That's why I'm independently elected." Days after making that comment, he closed the county's restitution center, which was a program that was just created that year.

Services

Enforcement Division

The Enforcement Division acts as 9-1-1 response and patrol. The Enforcement Division primarily patrols east Multnomah County. Every law enforcement deputy working within the patrol division is a sworn armed police officer. Since 1965, each enforcement deputy has been required to hold a bachelor's degree from an accredited college or university.

River Patrol Unit
The River Patrol Unit was founded to help decrease thefts from property on Multnomah County's waterways and to assist with search and rescue operations. The unit is responsible for 100 miles of river of the Columbia, Willamette, and Sandy rivers.

Special Investigations Unit (SIU)
The Special Investigations Unit performs investigations of illegal drug activity within the greater Portland metropolitan area. The Special Investigations Team performs raids, street-level undercover operations, and gathers evidence in civil forfeiture cases. The Special Investigations Unit is composed of deputies from Multnomah County, officers from the Gresham Police and Troutdale Police departments, as well as an investigative technician.

Reserve Deputy Program

The Reserve Deputy Program is a volunteer-based law enforcement support program operated by the Sheriff's Office. Reserve deputies are sworn peace officers within the state of Oregon, are armed and can perform the same duties as a full-time police officer, although they do not regularly take emergency or 9-1-1 calls. Reserve Deputies primarily cover officers, assist with prisoner transport, and work traffic details. Reserve Deputies also serve as the Sheriff's Office mounted patrol.

Corrections Emergency Response Team (CERT)
The Corrections Emergency Response Team responds to incidents within Multnomah County's correctional system. In 1997, CERT was developed to deal with the ever-growing number of inmates and violent crimes occurring within Multnomah County correctional facilities. CERT officers are trained in specialized tactics that differ from such training as that of SWAT or other emergency response divisions would receive, because incidents that CERT would respond to mostly happen indoors and with violent offenders. The Crisis Negotiation Team works closely with CERT to resolve hostage situations safely. CERT commonly responds and deals with barricaded persons, mobile booking/mass arrest situations, hostage rescue, major/minor disturbances, less lethal situations, and lethal situations.

Civil Process Unit
The Civil Process Unit includes three separate divisions: Civil Process, Extraditions, and Mental Health Transport. This unit upholds all civil court mandated orders, consisting of but not limited to: the service-of-notice process in civil lawsuits, enforcing county issued restraining orders, and serving eviction notices. The mental health transport is responsible for the safe and efficient transport of the criminal or dangerous mentally ill.

Dive Team
The Dive Team are sworn members who are on call 24 hours a day. All members must be full-time deputies and be willing to respond to emergency call outs 24 hours a day. The team primarily responds to the Columbia and Willamette rivers where they perform such tasks as rescues, recoveries, and homeland security missions.

Facility Security Unit
The Facility Security Unit is responsible for providing security to a variety of county owned buildings and facilities. Some facilities include The Justice Center, The Multnomah County Courthouse, The East County Courthouse, The Juvenile Justice Complex, The Inverness Jail, The Gateway Center for Domestic Violence, as well as a handful of Multnomah County Libraries.

Fallen officers
Since the establishment of the Multnomah County Sheriff's Office, eight officers have died in the line of duty.

See also 
Faces of Meth
Multnomah County Sheriff's Office Search and Rescue
List of law enforcement agencies in Oregon

References

External links 
  Multnomah County Sheriff's Office
 Multnomah County Emergency Management

Multnomah County, Oregon
Sheriffs' offices of Oregon
1854 establishments in Oregon Territory